Lost Ones or The Lost Ones may refer to:

Film
The Lost One (German: Der Verlorene), a 1951 West German film starring and directed by Peter Lorre
The Lost One (film), an alternate title for the 1947 Italian film The Lady of the Camellias
Defiance: The Lost Ones, a five-part series of minisodes released in 2014 on Syfy.com

Literature
The Lost Ones (Beckett), English translation of Samuel Beckett's 1970 short story Le dépeupleur
The Lost Ones (by Javellana), alternative title for Stevan Javellana's 1947 Filipino war-time novel, Without Seeing the Dawn
The Lost Ones (novel), novel by Ian Cameron, later made into a 1974 Disney movie The Island at the Top of the World
The Lost Ones (Tristan), Frédérick Tristan's 1983 Prix Goncourt winning novel Les égarés
The Lost Ones (comic), 2008 comic series

Music
"Lost Ones" (Lauryn Hill song), 1998
"The Lost Ones" (Ted Hawkins song), 1982
"Lost One" a 2006 single by Jay-Z
The Lost Ones, the third disc of Enigma's compilation box set, The Platinum Collection